The Oxford Handbook of the Study of Religion is a scholarly book about the academic study of religion. Edited by Michael Stausberg and Steven Engler, the book was published in the United Kingdom in 2016. The book has been reviewed in professional journals.<ref
   name=scott18></ref><ref
   name=schilbrack18></ref><ref
   name="carlson17"></ref><ref
   name="RodriguesdaCruz17"></ref><ref
   name="alderink18"></ref>

References

2016 non-fiction books
Religious studies books
Oxford University Press books